His & Hers is an American sitcom that aired from March 5, 1990 to August 22, 1990.

Premise
Two married marriage counselors with kids from a former union.

Cast
Martin Mull as Doug Lambert
Stephanie Faracy as Reggie Hewitt
Blake Soper as Noah Lambert
Lisa Picotte as Mandy Lambert
Blair Tefkin as Debbie
Richard Kline as Jeff Spector

Episodes

References

External links
 

1990 American television series debuts
1990 American television series endings
1990s American sitcoms
English-language television shows
Television shows set in Los Angeles
CBS original programming
Television series by CBS Studios